The year 1917 was marked, in science fiction, by the following events.

Births and deaths

Births 
 February 25 : Anthony Burgess, British writer (died 1993)
 March 17 : Charles Fontenay, American writer and journalist (died 2007)
 April 5 : Robert Bloch, American writer (died 1994)
 August 28 : Jack Kirby,  American scenarist and illustrator (died 1994)
 November 1 : Zenna Henderson, American writer (died 1983)
 December 16 : Arthur C. Clarke, British writer (died 2008)

Deaths

Events

Awards 
The main science-fiction Awards known at the present time did not exist at this time.

Literary releases

Novels 
 A Princess of Mars, by Edgar Rice Burroughs.

Stories collections

Short stories

Comics

Audiovisual outputs

Movies

See also 
 1917 in science
 1916 in science fiction
 1918 in science fiction

References

science-fiction
Science fiction by year